The 2016 Tajik Supercup was the 7th Tajik Supercup, an annual Tajik football match played between the winners of the previous season's Tajik League and Tajik Cup. The match was contested by 2015 Tajik League and 2015 Tajik Cup champions, Istiklol, and the 2015 Tajik League Runners-up, Khujand. It was held at Stadium Metallurg 1st District in Tursunzoda four days before the first game of the 2016 Tajik League. Istiklol won the match 3–2 thanks to an 82nd-minute winner from Oleksandr Kablash, his second of the match. After Istiklol took the lead through Kablash, Khujand equalised through Farkhod Tokhirov from the penalty spot, before Davron Ergashev restored Istiklol's lead shortly after. Dilshodzhon Karimov squared the game up midway through the second half, before Kablash's second gave Istiklol their sixth Supercup title.

Match details

See also
2015 Tajik League
2015 Tajik Cup

References

Super Cup
Tajik Supercup